George R. Smith College was a Historically Black College located in Sedalia, Missouri, it was attended by the famed and prolific American ragtime-music piano composer Scott Joplin famous for the piano music piece "Maple Leaf Rag."  The institution was associated with the Freedmen's Aid and Southern Education Society of the Methodist Church and played an important role in the lives of young people for several decades.

According to the Encyclopedia of the History of Missouri by Howard Conrad, the building was completed in 1882. The college operated from 1894 until it burned down in April 26, 1925, after which its assets were merged with the Philander Smith College in 1933. A photograph of George R Smith College, with students, can be found among the references listed here.

Notable alumni
 Myrtle Craig Mowbray, first African American woman to graduate from Michigan State University, in 1907
 John Wesley Donaldson, baseball player
 Scott Joplin, ragtime music piano composer
 Arthur Marshall, ragtime composer and contemporary of Scott Joplin
 T. Manuel Smith, MD, president of the National Medical Association (1942-1943)

Presidents
P. A. Cool, 1894-1897
E. A. Robertson, 1897-1902
I. L. Lowe, 1902-1907
A. C. Maclin, 1907-1910
J. C. Sherrill, 1910-1912
George Evans, 1912-1914
Matthew Simpson Davage, 1914-1916, later served as president of Haven Institute, Samuel Huston College, Rust College, and Clark University
Robert B. Hayes, 1916-1925

References

External links 

 African American Methodism and Higher Education in Missouri
 The Biggest Little Black College on the Prairie

Sedalia, Missouri
Defunct private universities and colleges in Missouri
Historically black universities and colleges in the United States
Buildings and structures in Pettis County, Missouri
Scott Joplin
Education in Pettis County, Missouri